Tropocyclops is a genus of copepod crustaceans in the family Cyclopidae. It contains the following species:

Tropocyclops affinis (G. O. Sars, 1863)
Tropocyclops bopingi Dumont, 2006
Tropocyclops breviramus Hsiao, 1950
Tropocyclops brevis Dussart, 1972
Tropocyclops brevispinus Shen & Tai, 1962
Tropocyclops candidiusi (Harada, 1931)
Tropocyclops chinei Dang, 1967
Tropocyclops confinis (Kiefer, 1930)
Tropocyclops extensus Kiefer, 1931
Tropocyclops federensis Reid, 1991
Tropocyclops frequens Kiefer, 1931
Tropocyclops ishidai Lee & Chang, 2007
Tropocyclops jamaicensis Reid & Janetzky, 1996
Tropocyclops jerseyensis Kiefer, 1931
Tropocyclops levequi Dumont, 1981
Tropocyclops longiabdominalis Shen & Tai, 1962
Tropocyclops matanoensis Defaye, 2007
Tropocyclops mellanbyi Onabamiro, 1952
Tropocyclops miser (Brehm, 1953)
Tropocyclops nananae Reid, 1991
Tropocyclops nigroviridis Harada, 1931
Tropocyclops onabamiroi Lindberg, 1950
Tropocyclops parvus Kiefer, 1931
Tropocyclops piscinalis Dussart, 1984
Tropocyclops polkianus Einsle, 1971
Tropocyclops prasinus (Fischer, 1860)
Tropocyclops pseudoparvus Dussart & Fernando, 1986
Tropocyclops rarus Dussart, 1983
Tropocyclops schubarti Kiefer, 1935
Tropocyclops setulifer Lee & Chang, 2007
Tropocyclops tenellus (G. O. Sars, 1909)
Tropocyclops varicoides (Brady, 1908)

References

Cyclopidae
Cyclopoida genera
Taxonomy articles created by Polbot